Maine is divided into 2 congressional districts, each represented by an elected member of the United States House of Representatives.

Unlike every other US state except for Nebraska, Maine apportions two of its Electoral College votes according to congressional district, making each district its own separate battleground in US presidential elections. Following the 2016 elections, the 2nd district had the sole Republican representative in New England. After 2018, however, the Republican incumbent was ousted by a Democratic challenger. As a result, all of New England was represented by Democrats in the House of Representatives.

Current districts and representatives
The districts are currently represented in the 118th United States Congress by 2 Democrats.

Historical and present district boundaries
Table of United States congressional district boundary maps in the State of Maine, presented chronologically. All redistricting events that took place in Maine between 1973 and 2013 are shown.

Obsolete districts
Maine's at-large congressional district since 1821
Maine's 3rd congressional district since the 1960 census
Maine's 4th congressional district since the 1930 census
Maine's 5th congressional district since the 1880 census
Maine's 6th congressional district since the 1860 census
Maine's 7th congressional district since the 1850 census
Maine's 8th congressional district since the 1840 census

See also
United States congressional delegations from Maine
List of United States congressional districts

References